Aleiphaquilon tricolor is a species of beetle in the family Cerambycidae. It was described by Martins in 1975.

References

Neocorini
Beetles described in 1975